Enosis Neon THOI Lakatamia (Youth Union THOI Lakatamia) is a Cypriot football club, based in Lakatamia, Nicosia. Their colours are blue and yellow and their stadium is the Municipal Stadium of Lakatamia. In 2005–2006, it was playing in the Cypriot First Division.

Current squad

For recent transfers, see List of Cypriot football transfers summer 2020.

Achievements
Cypriot Third Division Winners: 3
 1983, 2000, 2015
Cypriot Fourth Division Winners: 1
 1999
Cypriot Cup for lower divisions Winners: 1
 2013

References

External links
Official Website

Football clubs in Cyprus
Association football clubs established in 1948
Football clubs in Nicosia
1948 establishments in Cyprus